The 2022 USFL season was the inaugural season of the United States Football League, and the first season of a league using that name since 1985. The season began on April 16 and concluded on July 3. The league's eight teams represent various geographical locales and associated team names that were part of the 1984 season of the original USFL. For 2022, all regular-season games were played in Birmingham, Alabama, at Protective Stadium (Weeks 1–7, 9) and at Legion Field (Weeks 8 & 10).

The USFL played its postseason at Tom Benson Hall of Fame Stadium, adjacent to the Pro Football Hall of Fame in Canton, Ohio. The Birmingham Stallions won the USFL Championship game against the Philadelphia Stars on July 3.

Location

The city of Birmingham and the USFL announced that the city would host all eight teams. Regular-season games are played at Protective Stadium and Legion Field.

The choice of Birmingham as the league's sole city led to substantial crowds for the Birmingham Stallions and to very small crowds for games involving only teams named after other cities and states. The opening-week matchup between the Tampa Bay Bandits and Pittsburgh Maulers, rescheduled to Monday night, was played in an almost entirely empty stadium. USA Today reported that during the Week 2 matchup between Pittsburgh and Philadelphia, crowd shots included more Fox broadcast staff members than fans.

On February 16, 2022, the league announced that the 2022 playoffs would be held in Canton, Ohio, at Tom Benson Hall of Fame Stadium instead of Birmingham due to schedule conflicts with the 2022 World Games. Playoffs were held on June 25 and July 3.

Teams
The eight teams competing in the USFL's 2022 season all feature the names and colors of USFL teams that existed in 1984. During the 2022 season, all regular-season games were held at Protective Stadium (Week 1–7, 9) and Legion Field (Week 8 & 10) in Birmingham, Alabama.

Players
For the 2022 season, all eight carried a 38-man active roster and a seven-man practice squad (45 total). After week 5 the league announced they'll expands game-day rosters by two, total rosters by five (40/10). Contrary to other leagues, since injured players did not get paid, they were released after they got injured instead of reverting to "injured reserve list". 

In May, 2022 the organization contacted players from the newly formed USFL in attempt unionize, with a petition to represent the approximately 360 USFL players was later filed at the National Labor Relations Board (NLRB). The UFPA would later join forces with the United Steelworkers as the players union representation on behalf the USFL players.

Compensation
USFL players and staff will be able to receive a college degree "tuition-free and debt-free", through a partnership with for-profit universities Strategic Education's Capella University and Strayer University. They will be able to take classes online or in-person.

USFL players receive weekly salaries of $4,500 for active roster players, $1,500 for practice squad players, and $600 during training camp, while injured players did not get paid. Players also receive bonuses of $850 per regular-season or postseason win and $10,000 for winning the championship. Players had to cover their own housing costs, but the league offered hotel rooms at a discounted price of $75 per room per day, with an option for two players to share a room.

Draft

The 2022 USFL Draft occurred on February 22 and 23, 2022, and had a format similar to the 2020 XFL Draft, where players were selected in phases based on positions. Michigan quarterback Shea Patterson was the first overall pick by the Michigan Panthers.

Player movement

The USFL has instituted a standard professional football system where players who are cut by a team will be put on waivers for 24 hours. During this period, a player can be claimed by any other team. After the third regular-season game, the League based its waiver priority on inverse league standings. Players clearing waivers with no claim were released, no longer be under USFL contract, and became free agents.

 On April 1, New Jersey Generals first round draft pick Ben Holmes 2022 due to a toe injury and replaced by Luis Perez.

 On May 26, quarterback Shea Patterson was released by Michigan and claimed by New Orleans.

 On May 28, quarterback  KJ Costello Stanford signed a contract with Philadelphia Stars.

 On June 2, Houston Gamblers starting quarterback Clayton Thorson was placed on the inactive list after suffering an elbow injury.

Standings

Season schedule 
The league announced in November 2021 that teams would each play a ten-game schedule, with each team facing divisional opponents twice and non-divisional opponents once. The champion and runner-up of each division will qualify for the playoffs, which will consist of two semifinal games played on June 25 and a championship game played on July 3. Most games were played on Saturdays and Sundays, with some "special broadcasts" on Fridays. On January 6, 2022, the league announced on its website that the season would begin on April 16.

The full 2022 season schedule was released March 7, 2022, with the highlights including a doubleheader of Week 1 games on Easter Sunday.

Regular season 
All games at Protective Stadium during Weeks 1–7 and 9, and at Legion Field during weeks 8 and 10. All times listed are EDT. All games on NBC are simulcast on Peacock.

Changes to game schedules or broadcasting are listed in notes after each week's matchups.

All matchups will be officially announced by the league no later than 2 weeks ahead of game time and may be flexed from cable to broadcast if needed.

The playoff bracket was set after the Week 9 contests, rendering Week 10's games to be effectively exhibition games. In an effort to avoid tanking, the USFL declared that the two lowest-ranked teams—both coincidentally set to play each other that day—would be playing for the rights to the first overall pick in the 2023 USFL Draft, with the winner receiving that selection.

Week 1

Week 2

Week 3

Week 4

Week 5

Week 6

Week 7

Week 8

Week 9

Week 10

Playoffs 
The playoffs started on June 25 and ended with the championship on July 3. All games were played at Tom Benson Hall of Fame Stadium.

Awards and statistics

All-USFL Team
The following 25 players were selected by the league as "athletes who played consistently well over the course of the season".

Offense

Defense

Special teams

Players of the Week
The following Players of the Week were named the top performers (by the fans voting in a poll) during the 2022 season:

Regular season

Playoffs

League finances
Fox Sports owns the league and has reportedly committed $150 million–$200 million over three years to its operations, with plans to attract an additional $250 million from investors. For the 2022 regular season, tickets cost $10 per person, with children aged 15 and under free. However, for the 2 division finals games tickets will cost $15 per person with children aged 15 and under $5, for the championship game those prices are increased by $5 (meaning $20 per person and $10 for children 15 and under) Tickets provide access to all games scheduled for the same day. On March 3, 2022, the league announced that 15 states have approved legal, regulated betting on USFL games.

The league draws revenue of less than $10 million, making it ineligible to seek P visas for players from outside the United States; Liam Dobson, a Canadian offensive lineman, was disqualified from playing in the USFL because of the league's lack of revenue.

Media

Broadcasting
Telecasts for the 2022 season were produced by Fox Sports and NBC Sports. Fox broadcast 13 regular season games (1 simulcast with NBC), 1 semi-final, and the championship game. NBC broadcast 8 regular season games (1 simulcast with Fox)  and 1 semi-final. Peacock broadcast 4 games exclusively and simulcast all NBC games (including the opening game simulcast with Fox and NBC). Other games air on Cable networks USA Network (8 games) and FS1 (7 games).

The opening game was broadcast on April 16, 2022, at 7:30 PM Eastern time on both Fox and NBC. Fox produced the game and NBC produced all studio coverage. It was the first football game to be simulcast across two major American broadcast networks since the 2007 New England Patriots–New York Giants game.

Fox brought back its lead XFL broadcast team from 2020, Curt Menefee and Joel Klatt, for USFL coverage. Kevin Kugler and Mark Sanchez serve as the second broadcast team. Brock Huard reports from the sidelines during selected games.

The NBC crew features Jac Collinsworth and Paul Burmeister handling play-by-play duties alongside analysts Jason Garrett, Michael Robinson and Cameron Jordan. Zora Stephenson and Corey Robinson are sideline reporters and Sara Perlman hosts halftime and post-game coverage.

United By Football
During the season, Fox also aired a 13-part documentary series called "United by Football: A Season in the USFL" which produced by the league, NFL Films and Fox Sports. The series followed the USFL players and coaches "behind-the-scenes" during their 2022 journey, starting with the inaugural USFL Player Draft in Birmingham, and conclude with the USFL Championship game. The series averaged 720,000 viewers per episode.

Viewership and Reception
The first week of games received mixed reviews. Although 3.07 million viewers tuning in for the league first game and 2.15 million for the second and the level of play was good, some criticized the first game simulcasting and especially the camera angles and drones shots, while others praised the helmet cam and sideline access. The viewership dropped 57% in the second week, while numbers continue to decline throughout the season with a season low of 337,500 average for the final week. Regular season averaged 695,000 viewers per game. The USFL championship game averaged a 0.9 rating and 1.52 million viewers on FOX, and was the league’s highest rated and most-watched telecast since week 1.

Many were concerned about the attendance figures in the hub setting in Birmingham for non-Stallions games. While the league started strong with 17,500 fan in attendance for the first game, featuring the local Stallions vs New Jersey Generals, but the did not release figures for the other 39 regular-season games, which appeared to be played in a mostly-empty stadium. The poor attendance and the league’s inability to connect with fans in most of their city-named teams' markets, believed to hurt league image and credibility amongst casual and mainstream football fans. The USFL acknowledged the issue, and promised to play next season in two to four cities, and the USFL parent company, Fox, hired investment bank Allen & Company to find minority investors to help fund the league’s expansion into local markets.

The USFL experimented by putting sensors in game balls to measure first downs. This experience cause an issue during week 1, with poor passing attempts and kicking performance for punts, field goals, and extra points, given the distribution of the extra weight of the sensor. The league changed kicking balls before Week 2.

Signees to the NFL
After the season over 180 players got invited to NFL tryouts, 69 players were invited to NFL training camps and 13 players finished the 2022/23 season on active 53-man NFL rosters.

The following is  players signed with NFL teams at one point following their involvement with the USFL in 2022:

References

External links 

2022 USFL season
United States Football League (2022)
USFL